A Little Touch of Schmilsson in the Night is a 1973 album of classic 20th-century standards sung by American singer Harry Nilsson. The album was arranged by Frank Sinatra's arranger Gordon Jenkins, and produced by Derek Taylor. 

This album is notable in being a standards album produced a decade before such works started to become popular again. The title is an allusion to Shakespeare's Henry V, Act 4, in which the Chorus refers to Henry's nocturnal visit to his troops as "a little touch of Harry in the night".

The album's title refers to Nilsson's colloquial nickname from his previous two albums, "Nilsson Schmilsson" (1971) and "Son of Schmilsson" (1972).

A Little Touch of Schmilsson in the Night was dedicated to Frank Wills, the security guard who discovered the Watergate break-in. On the cover photograph, shot by Tom Hanley (known for his black and white shots of The Beatles), Nilsson is wearing lapel buttons depicting Wills and the singer's son Zak.

The back cover of the original gatefold edition features track-by-track commentary on the songs penned by Nilsson and producer Derek Taylor.

The Gordon Jenkins arrangements incorporate interpolations of other standards in the collection as transitions between songs. The lyrics were sometimes altered from the most popular versions with alternate lyrics or occasional additions, changes that are referred to in the liner notes. "It Had to Be You" features a joke ending written by original songwriter Gus Kahn that finishes with the unusual lyrics "It had to be me/ Unlucky me/ It had to be you."

A Touch More Schmilsson In The Night (1988) 

In 1988, RCA released A Touch More Schmilsson in the Night, containing 6 previously unreleased songs, and 4 alternative takes from the original recording sessions. It also includes 2 songs from the 1977 album Knnillssonn. That album was met with a small release, was primarily only released in Germany, and did not meet markets outside of Europe until 1995 when it was released on CD in Japan. The cover art was based on Frank Sinatra's album cover art from In the Wee Small Hours.

Track listing

Charts

Personnel

Harry Nilsson – "The Singer"
Derek Taylor - producer
Judd Proctor – guitar
Charlie LaVere – piano
Ken Dryden – flute
David Snell – harp
Derek Taylor, Jim Brown, Jim Buck – French horn
Bill Povey, Bob Burns, Jock Sutcliffe, Martin Gatt, Roy Willox – woodwind
Alan Dalziel, Ben Thomas, Bram Martin, Brian Hawkins, Derek Jacobs, Eric Eaden, Francisco Gabarró, Frank Clarke, Fred Parrington, Gwyn Edwards, Harry Danks, Jack Mandel, Jack Rothstein, John Sharpe, John Underwood, Julian Gaillard, Laurie Lewis, Leo Birnbaum, Lou Sofier, Max Salpeter, Peter Benson, Peter Halling, Sidney Margo, Ted Bryett, Trevor Williams, William Armon – strings
Gordon Jenkins – arranger, conductor
Jack Mandel – music contractor
Technical
Martin Wyatt – associate producer
Chrissie Hayes – assistant producer
Phil McDonald – engineer
Tom Hanley – cover photography

References

Little Touch of Schmilsson in the Night, A
Little Touch of Schmilsson in the Night, A
Covers albums
RCA Records albums
Albums arranged by Gordon Jenkins
Albums conducted by Gordon Jenkins